Bunky Echo–Hawk (born 1975) is a Native American artist and poet who is best known for his acrylic paintings concerning Native American topics and hip-hop culture. He works in a variety of media that include paintings, graphic design, photography, and writing.

Biography 
Walter Roy "Bunky" Echo–Hawk Jr. is a member of the Pawnee Nation of Oklahoma, and an enrolled member of the Yakama Nation. He attended the Institute of American Indian Arts in the 1990s. He served as the "co-founder and the Executive Director of NVision, a national Native nonprofit that focuses on Native youth development," and he is also a traditional singer and dancer. In 2020, Echo-Hawk was featured in the PBS series American Masters for his work on Native rights and environmentalism.

Themes and style
Scholar Olena McLaughlin, writing in the journal Transmotion, categorizes Echo-Hawk's work as follows: "Although it is within the stream of Native
Pop, Echo-Hawk’s work leans more towards Pop Surrealism or Lowbrow, a movement that emerged in the 1970s after Pop Art. It engages popular culture, but in a more concrete story-telling way with slightly less ambiguity." In 2011 and beyond, Echo-Hawk collaborated with Nike to develop Native-inspired apparel through their N-7 and Power of Perseverance Collection.

Personal life and arrest 
On October 16, 2021, Echo-Hawk was injured and his 15-year-old daughter Alexie was killed in a head-on crash early morning, as they were driving to the Pawnee Nation for a ceremonial tribal dance in Oklahoma.

On January 10, 2022, Bunky Echo-Hawk was arrested for "lewd or indecent acts to children under 16." A girl reported to a Pawnee County DHS worker that "she was repeatedly touched inappropriately by Echo-Hawk, 46, between 'from the time she was 7 or 8 until 11 or 12 years old'." His preliminary hearing was scheduled for March 15, 2022.

Public collections 
Spencer Museum of Art
National Museum of the American Indian

Exhibitions 
 "Ramp It Up:  Skateboard Culture in Native America," National Museum of the American Indian, 2009
 Founder's Day Performance, Live audience intervention painting, Feb. 1, 2010, Willamette University
 "Bunky Echo-Hawk: Modern Warrior," Field Museum, 2013
 Shows in Minneapolis, Chicago, New York and Greensboro, NC

References

External links

 bunkyechohawk.com, official website
Oral History Interview with Bunky Echo-Hawk

1975 births
Living people
20th-century Native Americans
21st-century Native Americans
Institute of American Indian Arts alumni
Naropa University alumni
Native American painters
Pawnee people
Yakama
20th-century American painters
21st-century American painters
20th-century American male artists
21st-century American male artists
People from Toppenish, Washington
Painters from Washington (state)